Salihli railway station is a railway station in Salihli, Turkey and is the only station within the city. TCDD Taşımacılık operates a daily inter-city train from İzmir to Konya and a daily regional train to İzmir to Uşak.

The station was originally built by the Smyrna Cassaba Railway in 1875 as part of their railway from Smyrna (modern-day İzmir) to Karahisar. Salihli station consists of a single side platform, serving one track. A small freight yard and freight house are located adjacent to the station.

References

Railway stations in Manisa Province
Railway stations opened in 1875
Buildings and structures in Manisa Province
Transport in Manisa Province
Salihli